Hollis Jeffcoat (May 13, 1952 – April 28, 2018) was an American "third generation" abstract expressionist painter.

While attending the New York Studio School from 1973 to 1976, Jeffcoat studied with Andrew Forge, Philip Guston, George McNeil, Meyer Schapiro, Jack Tworkov and Charles Cajori. She apprenticed with Joan Mitchell in Vétheuil, France from 1976 to 1979, and collaborated with Jean Paul Riopelle on printmaking, painting and ceramic projects in Paris and Montreal from 1979 to 1986.

Jeffcoat's work is widely collected and hangs in several museums in Canada and New York City, including the Metropolitan Museum of Art, Brooklyn Museum and the Morgan Library. She's had 21 solo exhibitions and participated in 44 group shows throughout the United States, Canada and France. Her paintings are part of the permanent collections of the Matisse family and Joan Mitchell.

Hollis Jeffcoat died at the age of 65 on April 28, 2018.

References

1952 births
2018 deaths
People from Sanibel, Florida
20th-century American painters
21st-century American painters
Abstract expressionist artists
American women painters
20th-century American women
21st-century American women